Love Is in the Air is the fourth studio album by Australian pop singer John Paul Young, released in 1978. The album was produced by Vanda & Young and released through Albert Productions. It peaked at number 32 in Australia. The album spawned the singles "Love Is in the Air", "The Day That My Heart Caught Fire", "Lost in Your Love" and "Fool in Love".

In Europe, the album was titled Lost in Your Love, so as not to be confused with the compilation album released earlier in 1978. This version featured the additional song "Good Good Good".

In the US, the album was released under its original title of Love Is in the Air – and with the same original album cover – but featuring a longer version of the hit title track (length: 5:16), a reorganised track listing, and another Vanda & Young-penned song ("Things to Do") not featured on any other versions of the album in place of the songs "Red Hot Ragtime Band" and "It's All Over".

Reception

Village Voice critic Robert Christgau wrote: "If the title tune seems familiar it's because you tuned it out along with 'Kiss You All Over' a few months ago. The culprits are ex-Easybeats Harry Vanda and George 'No Relation' Young, the power-pop production heroes whose first LP with this singer actually did offer much of the bright thrust claimed for the style—not to mention the triviality that goes along with it. It didn't sell, though, and here V&Y prove their depth of aesthetic principle by mellowing and syncopating their boy into MOR AOR fodder, four leisurely tunes to the side."

Whitney Z. Gomes from AllMusic gave the album 3 out of 5 saying, "Except for his mellow cool and a few Rod Stewart moves, Young does not bring much to the party. Which doesn't matter since Aussie powerhouses Vanda & Young are the toastmasters; the brains from The Easybeats obviously knew they were onto something with the breezy lead single, because both "The Day That My Heart Caught Fire" and "Lost in Your Love" seem like the same song with different titles. "Open Doors" sports Supertramp keys... but otherwise this platter settles for smooth '70s sailing, and nothing's wrong with that."

Track listing

Australia

European International (released as Lost in Your Love)
Side A
 "Lost in Your Love" – 3:05
 "Fool in Love" – 3:00
 "Red Hot Ragtime Band" – 4:34
 "Open Doors" – 5:00
 "Lovin' in Your Soul" – 4:14

Side B
 "The Day That My Heart Caught Fire" – 2:55
 "Lazy Days" – 3:29
 "Good Good Good" – 3:59
 "12 Degrees Celsius" – 3:51
 "It's All Over" – 2:42
 "Love Is in the Air" – 3:27

US release 
Side A
 "Love is in the Air" – 5:16
 "Fool in Love" – 3:04
 "Open Doors" – 5:00
 "The Day that My Heart Caught Fire" – 3:03

Side B
 "Lost in Your Love" – 3:10
 "Lazy Days" – 3:29
 "Things to Do" (Harry Vanda / George Young) – 4:10
 "12 Degrees Celsius" – 3:41
 "Lovin' in Your Soul" – 4:17

Charts

References 

John Paul Young albums
1978 albums
Albums produced by Harry Vanda
Albums produced by George Young (rock musician)
Albert Productions albums
EMI Records albums